Fishman (established 1981) is an American company based in Andover, Massachusetts known for making guitar pickups and other products involved in the amplification of acoustic guitars and other stringed instruments.

History
In 1980 Larry Fishman made a prototype acoustic pickup in his basement, and by 1981 he had taken orders for pickups from the Guild Guitar Company. In 1982 the C.F. Martin Guitar Company ordered Fishman pickups; to accommodate it, Fishman and his company rented a larger manufacturing space, and began designing and making pickups for banjos, mandolins, violins, cellos and basses as well.

The company has also produced amplifiers and other guitar-related equipment since its beginning in 1981. They have been particularly known for producing high-quality acoustic amplifiers.

Fishman Fluence
In 2012 the company began working on a new pickup for guitars that used circuit boards, enabling it to be programmed. Most guitar pickups are made with wire coiled around a magnet. The Fluence was a solid-core pickup with a conventional magnet and two 48-layer circuit boards—a completely new approach, using techniques previously used in the aerospace and telecommunications sectors. Fishman hired Ching-Yu Lin, Ph.D. to analyze and charge the magnets used in their pickups. The company was able to control the consistency of the magnets and the stacked solid core to make each pickup consistent. They began manufacturing the new product in 2014.

Fishman continues to design and make pickups for guitar makers, including Paul Reed Smith guitars. They have designed an acoustic guitar pickup for the Fender Musical Instruments Corporation. ESP Guitars sells guitars incorporating Fishman Fluence pickups. Gibson installs Fishman pickups in its G-45 Series acoustic guitars. in 2019 Ibanez Guitars began selling a guitar model with Fishman pickups. Reverend Guitars and Schecter guitars sell guitars with Fishman Fluence pickups, and Caparison has begun installing Fishman pickups in their Dellinger basses.

Products
 Pickups
 Acoustic guitar soundhole pickup
 Amplifiers
 Effects pedals
 Performance audio systems
 Guitar bridge
 ToneDEQ Preamp

See also
 Acoustic guitar
 Busking
 Humbucker
 Single coil guitar pickup

External links
 Larry Fishman Oral History
 Fishman artists

References

Companies based in Massachusetts
American companies established in 1981
Manufacturing companies of the United States
Guitar pickup manufacturers
Electromagnetic components
Guitar amplifier manufacturers